Dienov Andres Koka (born 2 August 1996) is a Congolese swimmer. He competed in the men's 50 metre freestyle event at the 2016 Summer Olympics, where he ranked 82nd with a time of 28.00 seconds. He did not advance to the semifinals.

References

1996 births
Living people
Republic of the Congo male freestyle swimmers
Olympic swimmers of the Republic of the Congo
Swimmers at the 2016 Summer Olympics
Place of birth missing (living people)
Swimmers at the 2015 African Games
Swimmers at the 2019 African Games
African Games competitors for the Republic of the Congo